Chau Chau Kang Nilda also known as 'Guan Nelda' or 'blue moon in the sky'   is a mountain in the western Himalayas. It lies in the northern Indian state of Himachal Pradesh.

The mountain located 13 km northeast of Kaza, the main town in Spiti, in the district of Lahaul and Spiti district.

Climbing history
The Chau Chau Kang Nilda was first climbed in 1939 by J.O.M. Roberts (James Owen Roberts Merion) who crossed  Spiti from Kullu. He became the first mountaineer to visit Spiti. Indian expeditions climbed Chau Chau Kang Nilda in 1966 and again in 1981.

References

External links
 photo at flickr.com
 photo at flickr.com
 photo at trekearth.com

Mountains of Himachal Pradesh
Geography of Lahaul and Spiti district
Six-thousanders of the Himalayas